Ipomoea holubii is a species of flowering plant in the family Convolvulaceae.

Description 
Ipomoea holubii is a shrub 0.8-2.50 metres high, many-stemmed from the base which is a caudex and much branched. Branches laying flat on the ground or climbing at the tips. Leaves deciduous ovate-cordate to circular-cordate, sometimes oblong cordate. Flowers are pink. The seed pods are leathery.

Ipomoea holubii is often confused with Ipomoea bolusiana. In fact the caudex, flower of both are very similar if not identical. The difference seems to be that the leaves of the holubii are not needle-like but more elliptical lanceolate, slightly larger and longer and more spaced. And also the viny stems are longer and flowers more numerous.

Range 
Occurs in Malawi, Zambia, Zimbabwe, Mozambique, Namibia, Botswana and mainly the Northern Province. Grows in bushveld and grassland, also along roadsides and often on rocky soil.

Cultivation 
To reduce the risk of rot, keep the very aesthetic bulb above the ground rather than buried as it is in its natural habitat. But shade it in case of intense sun.

Plant with very slow growth, summer outdoors with regular watering. Wintering in a clear greenhouse, 6 ° C minimum, no watering when the stems have faded.

The soil must be very draining.

References

External links 
 
 
 http://www.bihrmann.com/caudiciforms/subs/tur-hol-sub.asp

holubii
Caudiciform plants
Flora of Southern Africa
Plants described in 1894
Taxa named by John Gilbert Baker